Mandur is a village in Guntur district of the Indian state of Andhra Pradesh. It is located in Tsundur mandal of Tenali revenue division.

See also 
Villages in Tsundur mandal

References

Villages in Guntur district